(also known as Suite Dreams, Wow-Choten Hotel or Suite Hotel) is a 2006 Japanese comedy film, written and directed by director Kōki Mitani. The film is set in a five star Tokyo hotel on New Year's Eve, and follows the misadventures of various hotel staff and guests in the run-up to midnight.

The film is reminiscent of the Hollywood screwball comedies of the 1930s and 1940s, and explicitly references the 1932 film Grand Hotel, whose plot also followed the interlinked lives of various characters in a fictional hotel over a short period.

Cast members include: Kōji Yakusho (Heikichi Shindo, the hotel accommodation manager), Takako Matsu (Hana Takemoto, the chamber-maid with a case of mistaken identity), Kōichi Satō (Katsutoshi Mutōda, the disgraced politician), Shingo Katori (Kenji Tadano, the bell boy with musical aspirations), Ryoko Shinohara (Yōko, the call girl), Keiko Toda (Tokiko Yabe, the deputy accommodation manager), Katsuhisa Namase (Takashi Seo), Kumiko Asō (Naomi Ohara), YOU (Cherry Sakura) and Toshiyuki Nishida (Zenbu Tokugawa, the aging enka star).

The film was nominated for 11 Japanese Academy Awards, but did not win in any of the categories.

Plot
The plot involves numerous characters, the different problems or situations they face in the run-up to midnight, and the ways that these different storylines interact and are resolved.  The various storylines include:

 Shindo, who used to work in the theatre, and who tries to hide the fact that he is now a hotel employee when his ex-wife unexpectedly arrives at the hotel.
 Shindo's ex-wife's husband, who is in the hotel to receive an award from a deer fertility research organisation, but is afraid his affair with Yōko will be found out.
 Yōko, the call girl who is having an affair with Shindo's ex-wife's husband, and gets involved with Mutōda in the course of the night.
 Takemoto, a chambermaid who is mistaken for the mistress of a wealthy elderly man.  The elderly man's son offers her money to leave his father; she tries to ensure that the couple can remain together.
 Mutōda, a Senator who is in the hotel hiding from the media, following his involvement in a corruption scandal. He is also the father of Takemoto's son.
 Kenji, a bellboy who wants to be a musician, but has decided to give up on his dream.
 Zenbu Tokugawa, the veteran enka star who is suicidal when not performing on-stage.

Reception
The film was the third highest-grossing domestic film at the Japanese box office in 2006 and, as of January 5, 2015, is the 93rd highest-grossing film in Japan, with ¥6.08 billion.

References

External links
 
 Review of the film at Dreamlogic.net

2006 films
Films directed by Kōki Mitani
2006 comedy films
Japanese comedy films
Films with screenplays by Kôki Mitani
2000s Japanese films
2000s Japanese-language films